Keka or KEKA may refer to:
 Keka-class patrol boat
 Keka Ferdousi (born 1960), Bangladeshi television chef and writer
 KEKA-FM, an American radio station
 Murray Field (ICAO code:KEKA), an airport in the United States